Farbreague is a mountain (Marilyn) in Offaly, Ireland. It is a popular walking destination in Offaly.

See also
List of mountains in Ireland

References

Mountains and hills of County Offaly